The Carle Illinois College of Medicine is the medical school of the University of Illinois Urbana-Champaign. Called the "World's First Engineering-Based College of Medicine," the school trains physician-innovators by integrating several engineering and entrepreneurship approaches into its medical training, and awards the degree of M.D. upon graduation.

History
The Carle Illinois College of Medicine was established on March 12, 2015 after the University of Illinois Board of Trustees approved the creation of the new college. The college welcomed its inaugural class of 32 students on July 2, 2018. The engineering-based college of medicine currently offers an M.D. degree focused at the intersection of medicine and engineering.

The college offers an MD degree as well as an MD/PhD program. All degrees earned at the Carle Illinois College of Medicine will be awarded by the University of Illinois at Urbana-Champaign. In November 2015, it was announced that the University of Illinois and Carle Foundation Hospital had signed a 10-year research affiliation agreement with the intent to encourage and enable new biomedical advances at the newly formed college of medicine. Dr. Rashid Bashir and Dr. Robert Good were selected as co-chairs for the Core Curriculum Group committee charged with designing the curriculum for the college. Dr. Bashir was hired as the executive associate dean of the college in September 2017. In August 2016, King Li was named the first Dean of the college of medicine.

The vision for an engineering-based medical education program gathered momentum after the University of Illinois released the results of its 2013 Visioning Future Excellence project in combination with its strategic planning process and an economic development report. Together, these visioning documents identified three major areas of positive academic, social and economic growth: data analytics, energy, and biomedical/bio-engineering. Included with the biomedical vision is the concept of an engineering-based college of medicine, which allows both University of Illinois at Urbana-Champaign and Carle Hospital to leverage their substantial assets and skills in a truly groundbreaking endeavor.

In July 2015, a key milestone was achieved with the University of Illinois Board of Trustees approving the definitive agreement between Carle and University of Illinois at Urbana-Champaign. On November 3, 2015, the first major step toward naming the Carle Illinois College of Medicine's founding dean began with the naming of a diverse 17-member committee to initiate the dean search. This became the first new college at University of Illinois at Urbana-Champaign since 1957.

Carle Illinois received preliminary LCME accreditation on October 10, 2017 and is expected to receive full LCME accreditation by 2023. Carle Illinois College of Medicine is one of few engineering-based medical school specifically designed to train a new kind of doctor, the earliest example of which is the Harvard–MIT Division of Health Sciences and Technology. This groundbreaking approach seamlessly integrates the university's unparalleled assets in engineering, technology and super-computing with Carle's nationally recognized, comprehensive healthcare system.

The other medical school in the University of Illinois system is the University of Illinois at Chicago College of Medicine. The University of Illinois College of Medicine had a regional campus in Urbana-Champaign for over 40 years, and was the primary site for the school's MSTP program. However, after 2022, Carle Illinois will be the only College of Medicine on the Urbana-Champaign campus, with degrees being awarded from the University of Illinois at Urbana-Champaign, not the UI Chicago campus. The final class of University of Illinois College of Medicine students are set to graduate in 2022, the same year the first Carle Illinois students are set to complete their degrees.

Admissions 
Carle Illinois uses a two-round, rolling admissions process. As of January 2019, the College only accepts applications from United States citizens or permanent residents who will have completed a bachelor's, master's or doctorate degree, in any field, from a U.S. or Canadian accredited college or university prior to enrollment. An MCAT score of at least 498 is required to apply. Carle Illinois considers applications on a holistic basis. Thus, there is no minimum GPA requirement, letters of recommendation are required as part of the application, and the College suggests that their applicants have strong backgrounds in biology, chemistry/biochemistry, mathematics/statistics, physics and social sciences. Upon review of the first round of applications, based on the criteria above, select applicants are invited to submit a second-round application. Admissions offers are given from the pool of submissions of successful second-round applications. Carle Illinois does not conduct interviews as part of the application process, as is traditional for some other medical schools.

The inaugural class of the Carle Illinois College of Medicine consisted of a group of 32 candidates, with 16 men and 16 women, averaging approximately 26 years of age. All of the students of the college's inaugural class received full, four-year privately funded scholarships, valued at approximately $250,000 each.

Education 
Carle Illinois College of Medicine is one of few medical schools that have been built from the ground up to focus on the intersection of engineering and medicine. Every course in the college was designed by a team composed of a basic scientist, a clinician, and an engineer. The curriculum's four pillar approach infuses basic sciences, clinical sciences, engineering and innovation, and medical humanities into all four years and places high value on patient-centered care, systems-based delivery, innovation and research, and early clinical exposure. Carle Illinois promotes an active learning environment. An important component of this is problem-based learning. During these sessions, medical education facilitators lead groups of eight students through solving authentic, real-world healthcare problems that are directly related to the topics being covered in classes. Another important component of the active learning environment is early clinical experience. Students begin working in the clinic within their first month at Carle Illinois. Under the guidance and supervision of physicians, students meet with real patients to apply the skills they learn in classes.

Research

Research Advisory Board 
Carle Illinois has two Research Advisory Boards: External and Internal. The external Research Advisory Board is composed of professors and doctors from colleges, universities and hospitals all across the country, while the internal board is composed of professors from various colleges at the University of Illinois, directors and other individuals from research labs across campus, and doctors from Carle Foundation Hospital.

Research mentors 
The students also have the opportunity to work closely with research mentors, researchers and professors from departments and colleges across the University. These research mentors are experts in their fields, and their goal is to help train and build the ideas of Carle Illinois students to develop high impact solutions for the real world.

Health Maker Lab 
The Health Maker Lab is an interconnected network of design and making facilities that stand ready and able to enable everyone to participate in the process of improving human health. Carle Illinois students have access to any of the facilities in the Health Maker Lab system to help them innovate new ideas at the intersection of engineering and medicine. The Health Maker Lab hosts an annual “Health Make-a-thon" competition in which students, community members, and citizen scientists submit their ideas on how to improve the human condition. Winners of the competition receive $10,000 in idea support to the Health Maker Lab network and mentorship from University of Illinois experts to further build their ideas. All Illinois citizens are eligible participate.

Student life 
Carle Illinois offers a comprehensive wellness program. The goal of the wellness program is to help the medical students maintain their overall wellness so they can focus on becoming high-impact physician-innovators. The college has also divided students up into Innovation Pods. The pods are groups of students and mentors that act as a support system for students, enable them to build meaningful personal relationships with each other and foster a community environment. Finally, Carle Illinois offers a program called Thrive, made of weekly, student-led wellness workshops that are designed to equip students with the tools and strategies they will need in medical school and in the medical profession. Carle Illinois students participate in these workshops alongside peers and student directors. Carle Illinois students also have access to the university-wide resources available at the University of Illinois at Urbana-Champaign.

Leadership

Faculty 

 Mark S. Cohen - Dean
 Stephen Boppart - Executive Associate Dean, Chief Diversity Officer
 George Mejicano - Associate Dean, Academic Affairs
 Blair Rowitz - Associate Dean, Clinical Affairs
 Ruby Mendenhall - Associate Dean for Diversity & Democratization of Health Innovation
 Amy Wagoner Johnson - Department Head, Biomedical & Translational Sciences
 Issam Moussa - Associate Dean for Research

See also
 Harvard–MIT Division of Health Sciences and Technology
 University of Illinois at Urbana-Champaign College of Engineering

References

External links
 Official Press Release
 Article: "Alexa, Give Me A Diagnosis"

Educational institutions established in 2015
Medical schools in Illinois
University of Illinois Urbana-Champaign colleges and schools
Public–private partnership projects in the United States
2015 establishments in Illinois